Halnaker Chalk Pit is a  biological Site of Special Scientific Interest north-east of Boxgrove in West Sussex.

This chalk pit is important as it has about 50% of the British population of a nationally rare and vulnerable plant, broad-leaved cudweed. Other plants include hoary plantain, scarlet pimpernel, bent grass, yellow-wort and autumn gentian.

The site is private land with no public access.

References

Sites of Special Scientific Interest in West Sussex